Rhosneigr is a village in the south-west of  Anglesey, north Wales. It is situated on the A4080 road some 10 km south-east of Holyhead, and is on the Anglesey Coastal Path. From the clock at the centre of the village can be seen RAF Valley and Mynydd Twr (Holyhead Mountain). The major towns of Holyhead and Llangefni and the city of Bangor are all within easy travelling distance. It is the most expensive place to live in Anglesey in terms of house prices.

The village contains four caravan sites, three campsites, holiday homes and bungalows, pubs, hotels, cafes, a village hall, a chapel, residential homes, a school, a fire station, a convenience store and post office, a pharmacy and a fish and chip shop. It is served by Rhosneigr railway station.

Etymology
The name Rhosneigr is derived from Welsh.  is a common prefix in Welsh place names, meaning 'moor' or 'moorland'. The second part of the name , is less clear, but it is likely to derive from the personal name 'Yneigr'. Yneigr was the grandson of Cunedda Wledig, an important leader in the area in the fifth century. Little is known about Yneigr, or how the village came to be named in his honour.

Governance
Prior to the 2012 Anglesey electoral boundary changes an electoral ward in the same name existed, electing a county councillor to the Isle of Anglesey County Council. This ward had a population taken at the 2011 census of 1,008. A by-election took place in November 2010 following the resignation of Independent councillor (and former council leader) Phil Fowlie. The election was won by another Independent, Richard Dew. Since the 1995 elections the ward had been represented by Independent councillors representing the Llifon ward. The two present councillors are Richard Dew (Ind.) and Gwilym O. Jones (Ind.).

Rhosneigr is in the community of Llanfaelog, which elects a community council.

Leisure
Recreational activities include: swimming, surfing, wind surfing, kite surfing, wakeboarding, shore and boat fishing, water skiing, golf, tennis and underwater diving.

Rhosneigr is home to Anglesey Golf Club. Maelog Lake Golf Club (now defunct) appeared prior to the First World War. The club and course disappeared at the onset of the Second World War.

It has a number of beaches including:
'Traeth Crigyll' that stretches from Pwll Cwch to Ynys Wellt (leading then to Traeth Cymyran), sandy beaches interspersed by rocks and views of Snowdonia. It is popular with watersports enthusiasts, notably windsurfers and sailors.
 'Pwll Cwch'  – a small, rocky beach where boats and yachts stay overnight.
'Traeth Llydan' which runs from the Porth y Tywod to the south Rhosneigr, ranging from pebble shores to pristine sandy shores. It is perfect for canoeing, walking and surfing. Traeth Llydan is a regular Green Coast Award Winner and is backed by sand dunes.

Llyn Maelog is around 65 acres in total with varying depth up to seven feet. It is a designated Site of Special Scientific Interest. There is a good stock of fish in the lake including perch, bream, roach and pike. A large variety of birdlife inhabits the reedbeds. Grey heron, snipe, reed warblers, coots, mallard, shelducks etc. Black-headed gulls nest on the small island. The lake is circled by public footpath and is popular with walkers. In 2011 it became the first lake in Wales to be classified as a village green.

Gallery

References

External links

Rhosneigr community website
A description of Rhosneigr during World War II, from “An Anthology of Anglesey” by Ray Renowden, 1997
Photos of Rhosneigr and surrounding area on geograph.org.uk

Former wards of Anglesey
Llanfaelog
Populated coastal places in Wales
Villages in Anglesey